The 2017 CONCACAF Gold Cup Final was a soccer match which determined the winners of the 2017 CONCACAF Gold Cup. The match was held at Levi's Stadium in Santa Clara, California, United States, on July 26, 2017, and was contested by the United States and Jamaica.

The United States won the final 2–1 for their sixth CONCACAF Gold Cup title.

Route to the final

Match

Summary
Jozy Altidore opened the scoring for the U.S. in the last minute of the first half with a free-kick from 30 yards which went over the wall and into the top left corner of the net with his right foot.

Jamaica equalized in the 50th minute from Je-Vaughn Watson after he met a corner from the right on the volley with his right foot at the back post from five yards out. With two minutes to go, Jordan Morris got the winning goal with a right foot shot to the right corner of the net from fifteen yards out after the ball broke to him in the penalty area.

Details
{{Football box
|date       = 
|time       = <includeonly>21:30

References

External links

Final
CONCACAF Gold Cup finals
United States men's national soccer team matches
Jamaica national football team matches
CONCACAF Gold Cup Final
CONCACAF Gold Cup Final
Jamaica–United States relations
CONCACAF Gold Cup Final
CONCACAF Gold Cup Final
History of Santa Clara, California
Soccer in the San Francisco Bay Area
Sports competitions in Santa Clara, California
American football competitions in California